Fradon is a surname. Notable people with the surname include:

Dana Fradon (1922–2019), American cartoonist
Ramona Fradon (born 1926), American comics artist